"Up Jumped the Boogie" is the debut single by Australian hip hop trio Bliss n Eso. It was released 26 January 2006 through Illusive Sounds as the first single from the trio's second studio album Day of the Dog. The song peaked at No. 56 on the ARIA Singles Chart. An additional EP of the song was released containing other tracks from Day of the Dog.

Samples
The song samples "One Man's Ceiling Is Another Man's Floor" by Paul Simon.

Track listing

Reception
Reception to the song was positive, OzHipHop.com wrote "Lead single ‘Up Jumped the Boogie’ is a great head-nodding anthem".

Chart performance
The debuted at No. 56 on the ARIA Singles Chart. It spent a total of six weeks in the top 100.

Charts

References

2006 songs
2006 debut singles
Bliss n Eso songs
Illusive Sounds singles